Stadium OSiR w Olsztynie (OSiR Stadium in Olsztyn) is a multi-use stadium in Olsztyn, Poland. It is currently used mostly for football matches and is the home ground of OKS 1945 Olsztyn. The stadium has a capacity of 16,800 people.

History 
The stadium was built in the 1970s. In 1994–2002, Stomil Olsztyn played its games in Polish First League there. On 24 June 1989 a game of the Polish Cup between Jagiellonia Białystok and Legia Warszawa (2:5) was played on the stadium. The match was watched by 20,000 fans. On 24 September 1997 venue also hosted friendly football match between Poland and Lithuania (2:0).

References 

Football venues in Poland
OKS Stomil Olsztyn
Buildings and structures in Olsztyn
Sports venues in Warmian-Masurian Voivodeship
Sport in Olsztyn